The 2018 Florida State Seminoles football team represented Florida State University during the 2018 NCAA Division I FBS football season. The Seminoles were led by first-year head coach Willie Taggart and played their home games at Doak Campbell Stadium. They competed as members of the Atlantic Division of the Atlantic Coast Conference.

The Seminoles finished the season with a losing record for the first time since 1976, missing a bowl game for the first time since 1981. Linebacker Brian Burns went on to be selected in the first round of the NFL Draft, with defensive tackle Demarcus Christmas being selected in the sixth round.

Previous season
The Seminoles finished the 2017 season 7–6, 3–5 in ACC play, to finish in sixth place in the Atlantic Division. They received a bid to the Independence Bowl where they defeated Southern Miss. Following the regular season, Jimbo Fisher left the program to become head coach of the Texas A&M Aggies.

Recruiting

Position key

The Seminoles signed a total of 21 recruits.

Preseason

Award watch lists

ACC media poll
In the preseason ACC media poll, Florida State was selected to finish second in the Atlantic division.

Preseason All-ACC teams
The Seminoles had two players selected to the preseason All-ACC teams, with one offensive selection and one on special teams.
Cam Akers
Ricky Aguayo

Schedule

Schedule Source:

Coaching staff

Roster

Rankings

Game summaries

Virginia Tech

Samford

at Syracuse

Northern Illinois

at Louisville

at Miami (FL)

Wake Forest

Clemson

at NC State

at Notre Dame

Boston College

Florida

Post-season

All-ACC
The Seminoles had five players selected to the All-ACC team, with three defensive selections and two offensive selections.
Brian Burns (First Team) 
Nyqwan Murray (Third Team)
Demarcus Christmas (Third Team)
Marvin Wilson (Honorable Mention)
Tamorrion Terry (Honorable Mention)

NFL draft

References

Florida State
Florida State Seminoles football seasons
Florida State Seminoles football